The 11th Air Squadron (第十一飛行戦隊 - 11th Hiko Sentai) was flying unit of the Imperial Japanese Army Air Service. The unit was established on 31 August 1938 at Harbin, Manchuria. The unit saw service in Manchuria during the Manchuria Incident, China during the Second Sino-Japanese War and Burma, Netherlands East Indies, Indochina, Rabaul, Solomon Islands, New Guinea, Philippines, Formosa and Japan during World War II. The unit was disbanded at Takahagi, Japan in late 1945.

Aircraft
Type 91 (December 1937 - June 1942)
Type 92 (December 1937 - June 1942)
Ki-27 (December 1937 - June 1942)
Ki-43 I (August 1942 - June 1943)
Ki-43 II (July 1943 - February 1944)
Ki-84 (March 1944 - August 1945)

Bases
Harbin Manchuria Jun 1932 Jun 1939
Saienjo Nomonhan May 1939 Sep 1939
Harbin   Sep 1939 Oct 1939
Wuchang China Oct 1939 Dec 1940
Harbin   Dec 1940 Nov 1941
Kukan Phu Quoc Indo China Dec 1941
Singora Thailand Dec 1941 Jan 1942
Kuantan Malaya Jan 1942 Feb 1942
Tandjungkarang southern Sumatra Feb 1942 Mar 1942
Palembang   Mar 1942 Jun 1942 (detachment)
Toungoo North Burma Apr 1942
Myingyan Burma Apr 1942 May 1942
Rangoon   May 1942 Jun 1942
Akeno   Jul 1942 Sep 1942
Mingaladon, Burma, October 1942 - November 1942
Rabaul West, New Britain, December 1942 - June 1943
Lae, New Guinea, January 1943 - March 1943
Buka, Bougainville, January 1943 - February 1943
Munda, Solomon Islands, January 1943 - February 1943 (detached)
Wewak, New Guinea,  March 1943 - May 1943
Madang, New Guinea, March 1943 - May 1943
Taisho, Japan, July 1943 - August 1943
Harbin   Aug 1943 Sep 1943
Laolian Manchuria Sep 1943 Dec 1943
Wuchang China Dec 1943
Canton   Dec 1943 Feb 1944
Tokorozawa   Mar 1944 Oct 1944
Ilan Formosa Oct 1944
Luzon Philippines Oct 1944 Nov 1944
Shimodate north of Tokyo Nov 1944 Dec 1944
Porac Luzon Dec 1944 Jan 1945
Chaochou Formosa Jan 1945 Feb 1945
Takaagi Kanto district Mar 1945 Aug 1945

References

Units and formations of the Imperial Japanese Army Air Service
Military units and formations established in 1938
Military units and formations disestablished in 1945